D'ZRT was a Portuguese boy band consisting of Paulo Vintém, Angélico Vieira, Vítor Fonseca and Edmundo Vieira. The band was created when Portuguese television channel TVI cast a band for their series Morangos com Açucar. The four members portrayed Topê, David, Zé Milho and Ruca. Ruca already had musical experience as a contestant on Operação Triunfo. Paulo Vintém was also on the same show, but was eliminated early on. 

Their self-titled first album was released in 2005 and was number-one in the Portuguese record chart for 21 weeks. In 2006, their second album, Original was released. After leaving Morangos com Açucar, their song "Verão Azul" was used in the third summer series. Their final album was Project, released in 2009.

Discography

Albums

Studio albums

Singles

DVD
DZRT - Ao Vivo no coliseu dos Recreios (2006) #1 in Portugal
DZRT - The Story (2006)

Books
DZRT - Passado, Presente e Futuro (2006)
 "DZRT - DZRT Project" (2009)

External links
 D'ZRT Project

Portuguese boy bands
Portuguese musical groups